This is a list of episodes of the western comedy TV series Alias Smith and Jones. 

Alias Smith and Jones originally aired in the United States on ABC. The series consisted of forty-eight 60-minute episodes and two 90-minute episodes. The first thirty-three episodes starred Pete Duel as Hannibal Heyes and Ben Murphy as Kid Curry. During the last seventeen episodes, Roger Davis played Hannibal Heyes.

Series overview

Episodes

Season 1 (1971)

Season 2 (1971–72)

Season 3 (1972–73)

References

External links
 

Lists of American comedy television series episodes